Plucking the Daisy is a 1956 French comedy film directed by Marc Allégret and starring Brigitte Bardot.

It was also known as Mam'selle Striptease and Please Mr Balzac.

Turner Classic Movies called it "a typical French romantic comedy... complete with a meet-cute on a train, and plenty of loving shots of Bardot's pert behind.... typical of the suggestive but innocuous films that Bardot made early in her career."

Plot
General Dumont discovers that his daughter Agnes is "A.D.", author of a scandalous under-the-counter novel.

He tries to send her to a convent but she escapes to Paris to live with her brother. On the train she meets Daniel, a journalist. Agnes thinks her brother is a rich artist but he's actually a poor guide in the Balzac Museum.

Agnes needs money and enters an amateur striptease contest. Daniel is covering the contest for his magazine.

Cast
 Brigitte Bardot as Agnès Dumont 
 Daniel Gélin as Daniel Roy 
 Robert Hirsch as Roger Vital 
 Darry Cowl as Hubert Dumont 
 Luciana Paluzzi as Sofia 
 Nadine Tallier as Magali 
 Jacques Dumesnil as General Dumont
 Madeleine Barbulée as Mme Dumont 
 Georges Chamarat as Bacchus 
 Mischa Auer as Alexis 
 Mauricet as Mr. Valentin 
 Yves-Marie Maurin as Toto 
 Patrick Maurin as Agnès' younger brother
 Jacques Jouanneau as Edouard 
 Henri Garcin as one of Daniel's friends
 Jean-Loup Philippe as one of Daniel's friends
 Michel Constantin as Un spectateur du strip-tease
 Marc Eyraud as a photographer
 Françoise Arnoul as herself

Production
Roger Vadim had just written a movie which launched Bardot as a leading lady, Naughty Girl. He called this movie "a hack job based on an 'original idea' by the producer which was anything but original... I changed the plot and wrote an amusing, romantic and sexy story."

Reception
In 1956, the film was the 20th most popular of the year, at the French box office. It was released before Bardot's film And God Created Woman, which was the 13th most popular and Naughty Girl which was 12th.

It was released in the US as Mademoiselle Striptease. The Washington Post called it "one of the nicest comedies of the summer." The Los Angeles Times called it "a most delightful, naughty and very funny comedy... Bardot strikes pure gold... it's strictly a fun show that doesn't try to prove a thing."

It was also released in the US as Please Mr Balzac. The New York Times said the "sole excuse for this singularly unfrothy and unfunny romantic comedy is Brigitte Bardot....[a] thin, old-fashioned, slightly smutty and extremely dull charade... The picture is pretty awful. It needn't have been."

References

External links

Plucking the Daisy at TCMDB
Plucking the Daisy at BFI
Review of film at DVD Journal

French comedy films
1950s French films
1956 comedy films
French black-and-white films